In telecommunications, an audit is one of:

 The act of conducting a review, examination and reconciliation of Telecom, Wireless and Network customer service records, invoicing and contract agreements in order to ensure the accuracy of budgetary forecasting.
 Independent review and examination of records and activities to assess the adequacy of system controls, to ensure compliance with established policies and operational procedures, and to recommend necessary changes in controls, policies, or procedures.
 Analysis of invoices, lines, rates, tariffs, taxes, plans, usage, call volume, systems, and contracts resulting in cost reduction, proper invoicing and optimization of telecommunication systems often conducted by an independent telecommunications consultant or firm.

The simplest audits consist of comparing current telecommunications billing and usage to the underlying rate structure whether that is dictated by contract, tariff, or price list. Complex audits utilize software applications, direct bargaining with service providers and activity reports that include detail down to an individual employee's usage.

Auditing methods and consultants 
In business, companies with significant telecommunications costs or a telecommunications focus normally either conduct audits internally or hire a consultant. No matter the method, typical audits encompass one or more of the following:

Telecom Expense Management (TEM): An ongoing analysis and adjustment of internal telecommunications procedures and billing designed to maximize savings. See also Wireless Expense Management
Telecom RFP (Request For Proposals): A proposed management plan designed to maximize efficiency, security and reliability in the business' communications. Consultants typically present an RFP for approval by their clients.
Management and Reporting: Ongoing telecommunications cost and activity analytics. Internal auditors and consultants both use software as part of the process: either a generalized database application or specialized applications designed for auditing.

Telecom audits can encompass every communications service that a business expends its budget on. Audits may focus on mobile phones and devices, Internet service or land line telephony, or they may encompass all three.

Current methods 
Internal Audit: A business accounting department will generally only conduct a telecom bill review in the months that trigger a red flag due to the sudden spike in the expense of a communications service. This is usually contained to the one telecom service provider who triggered the red flag and the rest of the invoices are left unexamined because they fall within the considered norm of a small monthly cost increase.

Contingency Fee Based Audit: 
In exchange for telecom consulting and bill auditing services a business can pay a percentage of all savings realized. 
Business Process Outsourcing BPO, telecom consultant companies can provide a contingency fee based independent review and examination of records and activities to assess the compliance of telecom service providers with telecommunication contracts and State and Federal Tariffs.

See also 
National Information Systems Security Glossary

References 

Telecommunications economics